Henri Laoust (1 April 1905 – 12 November 1983) was a French Orientalist. He is known for his work on the Hanbali school of thought and schisms within Islam. According to the  Islamic Hadith Scholar Muhammad Nasir ad-Deen al-Albani's foremost Student and likewise Hadith scholar in his own right, Shaykh Ali bin Hassan al-Halabi al-Athari states in his authentication (تحقيق) of the foundational Salafi Athari Hanbali book of creed "al-Sharh wa al-Ibanatu as-Sughra" penned down by Hanbali Scholar "Ibn ul-Battah al-Ukburi" printed 2009 he states "this beneficial book was first brought out and published from manuscript over half a century ago by Henry Laoust in Damascus in the year 1954."

Biography 
Laoust was born on Saturday, 1 April 1905 in Fresnes-sur-Escaut, France. He undertook part of his secondary education in Gouraud high school in Rabat, Morocco, where his father was director of the Institute for Advanced Moroccan Studies. Laoust finished his secondary education at the Lycée Louis-le-Grand, a prestigious public secondary school in France.

References 

1905 births
1983 deaths
École Normale Supérieure alumni
Academic staff of the Collège de France
French orientalists